"Sexy, Free & Single" is a song recorded in two languages (Korean and Japanese) by South Korean boy band Super Junior. The original Korean version was released as the group's thirteenth Korean single from their sixth studio album, Sexy, Free & Single on July 1, 2012 through SM Entertainment via digital download and streaming. The Japanese version was released through Avex Trax on August 22, 2012 as the group's fourth official Japanese single, and was distributed in two physical formats.

Background and release

Korean version
The title track "Sexy, Free & Single", describes the sexy and free life of a single man in a soulful Eurohouse genre with an easy and infectious chorus. It is composed and arranged by Danish songwriters Daniel 'Obi' Klein, Thomas Sardorf and Lasse Lindorff, with the Korean version written by Yoo Young-jin and the Japanese version written by Leonn. The group reportedly filmed a music video in Namyangju, Gyeonggi Province, with a Devin Jamieson choreographed dance for title track, "Sexy, Free & Single", who had worked with artists such as BoA, Michael Jackson, Britney Spears and Hilary Duff.  In addition, their performance also benefit from the support provided by other choreographers such as Lyle Beniga, Nick Baga and Devon Perri. On June 29, the teaser for the MV was released on their official YouTube channel, this was followed by the full music video on July 3.

Japanese version
On June 29, during the press conference at the Mnet 20's Choice Awards members of the group confirmed that they had recorded a Japanese version of title track, "Sexy, Free & Single", and an original Japanese MV, as well as other tracks. They did not announce plans for any promotional activities in Japan. On July 17, SM Entertainment announced that the track would be released on August 22, 2012, as their fourth Japanese single. On August 22, Super Junior officially released their fourth Japanese single "Sexy, Free & Single". After the first day of sales, the single placed second on the Oricon Daily Chart, selling 63,813 units. The following day, the Japanese version of "Sexy, Free & Single" placed second on the Oricon Weekly Chart by selling 109,821 units and later placed sixth on the Oricon Monthly Chart by selling 118,902 units. The song was certified gold in Japan for selling over 100.000 copies.

Accolades

Track listing
Digital download – 
 "Sexy, Free & Single" – 3:44

CD single / CD+DVD – 
 "Sexy, Free & Single" – 3:48
 "Our Love" – 6:11
 "Sexy, Free & Single" (Korean version) (CD-only version) – 3:49

DVD track listing'''
 Sexy, Free & Single - Music Video -
 Sexy, Free & Single - Music Video - [Korean ver.]
 Making Clip
 Way - SUPER SHOW4 in TOKYO ver. -[Memorial Clip] (limited edition CD+DVD only)

Chart performance

Korean version

Japanese version

Sales and certifications

Credits and personnel 
Credits adapted from album's liner notes.

Studio 
 Recorded, mixed and digitally edited at SM Booming System
 Mastered at Sonic Korea

Personnel 
 SM Entertainment – executive producer
 Lee Soo-man – producer
 Kim Young-min – executive supervisor
 Super Junior – vocals, background vocals
 Leonn – Japanese lyrics
 Yoo Young-jin – Korean lyrics, recording, mixing, digital editing, vocal director, background vocals
 Daniel "Obi" Klein – composition, arrangement
 Thomas Sardorf – composition, arrangement
 Lasse Lindorff – composition, arrangement
 Jeon Hoon – mastering

References

External links 
 SM Entertainment's Official Site
 Super Junior's Official Site

Super Junior songs
Korean-language songs
2012 singles
SM Entertainment singles
Songs written by Yoo Young-jin
Avex Trax singles
2012 songs